Bessarabia is a historical term for the geographic region in Eastern Europe bounded by the Dniester River on the east and the Prut River on the west.

Bessarabia may also refer to: 
 Bessarabia Oblast and Governorate, Russian Empire 1812-1917
 Bessarabian Soviet Socialist Republic, proclaimed 1919
 Bessarabia Governorate (Romania), 1941–1944
 Bessarabian question, a geopolitical dispute regarding Bessarabia
 Bessarabian, a Canadian Thoroughbred racehorse
 Bessarabian Stakes, named after the racehorse